Walter Stack (31 October 1884 – 26 March 1972) was an Australian cricketer. He played seven first-class matches for New South Wales between 1909/10 and 1912/13.

See also
 List of New South Wales representative cricketers

References

External links
 

1884 births
1972 deaths
Australian cricketers
New South Wales cricketers
Cricketers from Sydney